Coleophora astragalorum is a moth of the family Coleophoridae that can be found in Turkmenistan and Uzbekistan.

The larvae feed on Astragalus and Ammodendron species. They create a silky case with a dull white cover. The valve of this case is two-sided. Larvae can be found at the end of May and (after diapause) from the end of March to April.

References

External links

astragalorum
Moths of Asia
Moths described in 1973